Hillside Cemetery is a historic rural cemetery located at Clarendon in Orleans County, New York. The cemetery was established in 1866, and is the resting place of many early settlers.  The cemetery includes a mortuary chapel built in 1894 in the Gothic Revival style and stucco over concrete storage building (1928).  The last section of the cemetery was added in 1938.

It was listed on the National Register of Historic Places in 2013.

Medical pioneer Dr. Lemuel Whitley Diggs (1900–1995) is buried there. A cenotaph to conservationist and taxidermist Carl Ethan Akeley (1864–1926) is a large feature in the cemetery.

Gallery

References

External links
 

Cemeteries on the National Register of Historic Places in New York (state)
1866 establishments in New York (state)
Gothic Revival church buildings in New York (state)
Buildings and structures in Orleans County, New York
National Register of Historic Places in Orleans County, New York
Rural cemeteries